Shirazi-ye Olya (also Romanized as Shīrāzī-ye ‘Olyā; also known as Shīrāzī) is a village in Qarah Su Rural District, in the Central District of Kermanshah County, Kermanshah Province, Iran. At the 2006 census, its population was 37, in 8 families.

References 

Populated places in Kermanshah County